Witherslack is a former civil parish, now in the parish of Witherslack, Meathop and Ulpha, in the South Lakeland district of Cumbria, England. It contained 15 listed buildings that are recorded in the National Heritage List for England.  Of these, one is listed at Grade II*, the middle of the three grades, and the others are at Grade II, the lowest grade.  The parish is in the Lake District National Park, it is mainly rural, and contains the village of Witherslack and the surrounding countryside.  The listed buildings consist of farmhouses, farm buildings, houses and associated structures, a church with items in the churchyard, a bridge, a war memorial, and two limekilns.


Key

Buildings

References

Citations

Sources

Lists of listed buildings in Cumbria
South Lakeland District